Rebecca Rigg is an Australian actress. She is known for her roles in television and film. She started out as a child actor in Fatty Finn (1980), before also being featured in the films Hunting (1991), Spotswood (1992) and Ellie Parker (2005).

Early life and career 
Rebecca Rigg was born in Sydney, New South Wales, 31 December 1967.

Her Australian television appearances include the television series Rafferty's Rules (in which she appeared as the daughter of the Magistrate, Michael Rafferty); and the ABC television movies Joh's Jury, Come In Spinner, and Naked. As well as a starring role in the Australian comedy television series Willing and Abel (in which she appeared as "Angela Reddy"). As a young girl she was also in the Australian film Fortress, which was about the kidnapping of a teacher (played by Rachel Ward) and a small class of students. She appeared in the television miniseries Emma: Queen of the South Seas. 

She has made guest appearances in other Australian television series, including her brief recurring role of troubled teen Gabe in A Country Practice, The Flying Doctors, G.P., Blue Heelers and Winners.

Rigg had a role as Nurse Amy as part of the Mr Bad storyline on hugely popular Australian soap E Street, playing the girlfriend of her real-life boyfriend at the time, and future (ex) husband, Simon Baker.

After the birth of her youngest son, Rigg retired from acting to be at home with her children. She has then returned to acting to appear in the films Ellie Parker and Fair Game with Naomi Watts. She also guest starred alongside her husband in The Mentalist episode "A Dozen Red Roses".

Personal life
Rigg married Simon Baker in 1996 after five years together, and they have three children, including actress Stella Baker. They lived in Los Angeles from 1995 until 2015, when they moved back to Sydney, Australia. Rigg and Baker separated in April 2020.

 Filmography 

Film

Television

 Awards and nominations 
 1980: Aged 13, Rebecca Rigg was nominated for an AFI award for Best Actress in a Supporting Role for the film Fatty Finn''.

References

External links
 Rebecca Rigg – "A Country Practice" cast's actor filmographies
 Rebecca Rigg – Australian Film Commission website
 

Living people
20th-century Australian actresses
21st-century Australian actresses
Actresses from Sydney
Actresses from the Gold Coast, Queensland
American film actresses
American television actresses
Australian expatriate actresses in the United States
Australian film actresses
Australian television actresses
21st-century American women
Year of birth missing (living people)